Michael Frederic Neidorff (November 19, 1942 – April 7, 2022) was an American business executive and was CEO of Centene Corp from 1996 to 2022.

Early life and education 
Neidorff was born in 1942 in Altoona, Pennsylvania. He was a 1961 graduate of Altoona High School.

He earned a bachelor's degree in political science from Trinity University in 1965 and a master's degree in industrial relations at St. Francis University.

Career 
In the 1980s, Neidorff was the director of international consumer products at Miles Laboratories, and worked as president and chief executive officer of Physicians Health Plan of Greater St. Louis.

In 1995, he became chief executive of Group Health Plan and was vice president of its parent company, Coventry Corp. The following year, Neidorff joined Centene, then called Coordinated Care Corp., as its chief executive officer.

In 2018, Neidorff was one of the executives named in a lawsuit claiming that Centene failed to disclose Health Net's potential tax exposure prior to their acquisition.

In April 2020, Neidorff joined the White House economic recovery task force on reopening the United States after the COVID-19 pandemic.

In 2020, Neidorff earned $4.7 million in bonuses that contributed to a total yearly earnings of $24.96 million while laying off 3000 workers. 

Neidorff was listed on Fortune's Businessperson of the year list in 2017. He announced plans to retire in 2022 after Politan Capital Management took a stake in Centene. In March, he formally stepped down after Sarah London was named his replacement.

Personal life 
Michael Neidorff was married to Noémi Neidorff and they had two children.

Neidorff donated to several political causes, including Hillary Clinton and Joe Biden's presidential campaigns, the National Republican Senatorial Committee and Senator Jeanne Shaheen's reelection campaign. Neidorff and his wife Noémi, the former board chair of the Opera Theatre of St. Louis, were patrons to the arts and supported many music and educational organizations in Missouri and elsewhere. The main concert hall at the Manhattan School of Music is named in their honor.

He died of complications of an infection in St. Louis on April 7, 2022, at the age of 79.

References 

1942 births
2022 deaths
American business executives
Businesspeople from Pennsylvania
21st-century American businesspeople
Trinity University (Texas) alumni
People from Altoona, Pennsylvania